Concurrent Collections (known as CnC) is a programming model for software frameworks to expose parallelism in applications. The Concurrent Collections conception originated from tagged stream processing development with HP TStreams.

TStreams
Around 2003, Hewlett-Packard Cambridge Research Lab developed TStreams, a stream processing forerunner of the basic concepts of CnC.

Concurrent Collections for C++
Concurrent Collections for C++ is an open source C++ template library developed by Intel for implementing parallel CnC applications in C++ with shared and/or distributed memory.

Habanero CnC
Rice University has developed various CnC language implementations based on their Habanero project infrastructure.

See also
 Stream processing
 Flow-based programming (FBP)
 Tuple space
 Functional reactive programming (FRP)
 Linda (coordination language)
 Threading Building Blocks (TBB)
 Cilk/Cilk Plus
 Intel Parallel Studio

Notes

References

External links
Intel Concurrent Collections for C++ for Windows and Linux at Intel DZ, a "What If" project

Intel Concurrent Collections for C++ at GitHub

CNC - Habanero Concurrent Collections as part of the Rice University Habanero project

Parallel computing
Concurrent programming languages